KWOK (1490 AM) is a radio station broadcasting a sports format to the Aberdeen, Washington, United States, area.  The station is owned by Alpha Media LLC and features programming from Fox Sports Radio and Westwood One.

History
The station went on the air as KJET.  On April 13, 1999, the station changed its call sign to KGHO, and on February 18, 2000 to KWOK.

On September 23, 2016 KWOK was granted an FCC construction permit to increase night power to 1,000 watts.

References

External links
Fox Sports 1490 Facebook

FCC History Cards for KWOK

WOK
Sports radio stations in the United States
Alpha Media radio stations